In Polynesian mythology, Ulupoka is the god of evil and demons. The god is most prevalent in Fiji.  According to the tales, Ulupoka was decapitated during a battle with other gods. His head fell to the earth but, due to his divine nature, he did not die. His body would remain at his temple but his head now rolls around, causing mischief, illness, and death.

Notes

Fijian deities
Death gods
Evil gods
Demons